The Alcarria is a natural region in Castile (Spain). It  is located mainly in Guadalajara Province but also overlaps those of Cuenca and Madrid.  Its principal attractions are its fauna and flora and it is noted for its honey and a special breed of lamb.

The most notable towns in the region are: Almonacid de Zorita, Brihuega, Cifuentes, Guadalajara, Illana, Priego, Jadraque,  Mondéjar, Pastrana, Sacedón,  Trillo and Villalba del Rey. 

The region figures prominently in the travel book Viaje a la Alcarria (Journey to the Alcarria) by Camilo José Cela.

Geography 
La Alcarria is a kind of plateau brought out by the rising of the Sistema Ibérico. The strata that form this plateau are smoothly undulating. Limestones and gypsum are common because of its origins below the sea surface (from the Mesozoic Era; the red sandstone and the earth-originated conglomerated stones were more recently formed. Over this strata of sedimentary stones, the rivers have originated deep and quite often, broad valleys, gorges and many other karst phenomena, as those that can be seen in the north of the Province of Cuenca (Las Majadas, El Hosquillo, La Ciudad Encantada, Ravines of the rivers Beteta and Júcar and in almost the whole Province of Guadalajara (Canyon of River Dulce, high course of River Tagus, Ravine of River Corduentes and below the waters of the reservoir of Entrepeñas, also in the River Tagus). Is precisely, the name of Entrepeñas (among rocks) the one that represents the character of all the area, since River Tagus forms there a beautiful canyon close to Sacedón, where that dam is. 

The upper level of the plateau of La Alcarria is quite uniform as can be seen in the photo, although it descends softly from north to south. In this image you can also see the sudden valley to the right (to the South of Escamilla) made by the valley of the River Guadiela.

See also
Comarcas of Spain

References

External links
Descriptive article by the Spanish newspaper El Mundo (Spanish)

Alcarria, La
Guadalajara, Spain
Natural regions of Spain